Chen Li (traditional Chinese: 陳粒; simplified Chinese: 陈粒; pinyin: Chén Lì; born 26 July 1990) is a Chinese folk song singer, independent musician, singer-songwriter, and former lead singer of the Dreamer Band (空想家乐队). She was born in Guiyang, Guizhou and graduated from Shanghai University of International Business and Economics.

Music career 

 In 2014, along with the Dreamer Band(空想家乐队) released the band's first EP(extended play) album "Wan Xiang"(万象); "Qi Miao Neng Li Ge"(奇妙能力歌) was shortlisted for the annual folk single of the "Abilu Music Awards 2014".     

 In 2015, she released her first personal music album "Ru Ye"(如也).     
 In 2016, she won the most popular musician (folk) of the "Abilu Music Awards 2015"; she also released the first single "Huan Qi Yi"(幻期颐) and a new album "Xiao Meng Da Ban"(小梦大半).     
 In 2017, she composed and vocalized the theme song "My Dear Art" for the documentary "My Dear Art"(一个人的收藏).     
 In 2017, she took part in the show "Happy Boys"(快乐男声) as the music instructor. On February 22, 2017, she released her solo single "Xi Tai"(戏台); on March 7, she released an original single "Hao Zai"(好在) that was used as the ending song of the Web Drama "Solaso Bistro"(问题餐厅); On March 28, she released another single "Qing Zhu"(庆祝).     
 On January 5, 2018, she released the single "Yan Shan Tu"(研山图).

Discography

Regular Albums

Singles

Awards and nominations

References 

Chinese women singer-songwriters

1990 births
Living people
People from Guiyang